Vincent Obasi Usulor was elected Senator for the Ebonyi Central constituency of Ebonyi State, Nigeria at the start of the Nigerian Fourth Republic, running on the People's Democratic Party (PDP) platform. He took office on 29 May 1999.
 
After taking his seat in the Senate he was appointed to committees on Rules & Procedures, Industries, Science & Technology, Police Affairs, National Planning and Federal Capital Territory (vice chairman).

See also
 List of people from Ebonyi State

References

Living people
People from Ebonyi State
Peoples Democratic Party members of the Senate (Nigeria)
20th-century Nigerian politicians
21st-century Nigerian politicians
Year of birth missing (living people)